Liam Anthony Horsted (born 29 October 1985) is an English former professional footballer who played as a winger.

Career
Horsted moved from  Portsmouth to Dunfermline Athletic in August 2005 on a six-month loan deal. He moved on loan to Oxford United in March 2006, along with fellow Portsmouth player Andrea Guatelli. He was one of 7 player released by Portsmouth in May 2006 following the expiry of their contracts.

Horsted later played non-league football - he spent the 2006–07 season with Bognor Regis Town, and he later played for Cirencester Town, Havant & Waterlooville, Paulsgrove and AFC Portchester.

References

1985 births
Living people
English footballers
Portsmouth F.C. players
Dunfermline Athletic F.C. players
Oxford United F.C. players
Bognor Regis Town F.C. players
Cirencester Town F.C. players
Havant & Waterlooville F.C. players
Paulsgrove F.C. players
A.F.C. Portchester players
Scottish Premier League players
English Football League players
Association football wingers